Domasi is a community in Malawi to the northeast of Zomba.
It is the location of the Domasi College of Education.
The Shallow Well Project funded by the First Presbyterian Church of Urbana in Urbana, Illinois, United States is providing safe drinking water for the villages around Domasi. As of 2004, the project had installed 68 wells, serving about 36,000 people.

References

Populated places in Southern Region, Malawi